Whysall Lane is the eponymous debut album by Whysall Lane. The album was recorded by Jerry diRienzo at Hot Pie studios in California between 2002 and 2005.

The album was recorded using predominantly electric instruments and is reminiscent of lead singer Richard Baluyut's old band Versus. "During the Mutiny" was originally released in a different version on a 2002 split single with +/-. "Theme" dates from 1999, when it was first performed live.

The CD version of the album contains a hidden track "Little Moon" in the pregap of "Not a Fool". "Little Moon" can only be accessed by rewinding past the start of the first track. The running order listed on the CD cover is incorrect, and the track listing below follows the running order of the actual CD.

Track listing
 "Not a Fool" – 4:06
 "Half Life" – 4:33
 "Time Machine" – 5:00
 "The Way Back" – 3:59
 "Pillows " – 4:01
 "Wither Without You" – 5:38
 "During the Mutiny" – 4:50
 "Watts" – 6:08
 "Theme " – 4:35
 "High Heels " – 5:53

Personnel
 Richard Baluyut – guitar, vocals
 Mikel Delgado – bass, vocals
 Adam Pfahler – drums
 Jerry diRienzo – lead guitar, slide guitar
 James Baluyut – string arrangements, backing vocals
 Ric Quaglia – loops

References 

2006 debut albums
Whysall Lane albums